Doctor Dolittle (also known as The Further Adventures of Dr. Dolittle) is a 1970–1971 Saturday morning animated series produced by DePatie–Freleng Enterprises in association with 20th Century Fox Television. The series is loosely based on the books by Hugh Lofting, as well as the 1967 film of the same title which center around Doctor Dolittle, an animal doctor who has the ability to talk to animals.

The show was created for television by David H. DePatie and Friz Freleng in association with Paul Harrison and Lennie Weinrib. The series was broadcast on the NBC network. An altered version of the song "Talk to the Animals" was heard during the opening credits.

The series only has a DVD release in Germany from Pidax.

Synopsis
Doctor Dolittle travels around the world on his ship called the Flounder to help out any sick animal in need. He is aided in his missions by his first mate, young sailor Tommy Stubbins. They share the ship with its animal crew.

Wherever Doctor Dolittle's ship was, Sub-Mar Island was never far behind. A disguised submarine, Sub-Mar Island is actually the stronghold of Sam Scurvy and his pirate crew. The pirates dress in an unusual mixture of old-fashioned pirate and gangster gear. The pirate crew were also a branch of the Democratic Order of Pirates International (or "DOPI" for short). Sam Scurvy has one goal in life: world domination. He believes that if he can get the secret to talking to animals from Doctor Dolittle, he will be able to raise an army of "creepy creatures" to help him take over the world. By using his eavesdropping device the Sneaky Snorkel, Scurvy gets wind of Doctor Dolittle's latest missions and then plots to hinder, disrupt, or even kidnap the Doctor, Tommy, or any one of his animals, in order to force him to reveal how he is capable of talking to animals. However, due to Doctor Dolittle's skills as well as the pirates' ineptitude, they never succeed.

Characters

 Doctor Dolittle (voiced by Bob Holt in an English accent impersonating Rex Harrison) - an animal doctor who can talk to animals.
 Tommy Stubbins (voiced by Hal Smith in an English accent) - a sailor and Doctor Dolittle's first mate who can also talk to animals.
 Chee-Chee (voiced by Don Messick) - the cabin monkey.
 Dab-Dab - a duck who is also the ship's cook.
 Polynesia - the Doctor's pet parrot who taught him how to talk to animals.
 The Pushmi-Pullyu (voiced by Don Messick) - a llama which has two heads (one of each) at opposite ends of its body. It serves as the ship's lookout where it would often warn Dr. Dolittle about the approaching pirates. One head has a blue collar, while the other has an orange collar and wears glasses.
 Too-Too - the wise owl.
 Jip (voiced by Don Messick) - the Doctor's pet dog.
 George and the Grasshoppers - a rock group of grasshoppers that lives inside Doctor Dolittle's medicine case and are led by George (voiced by Lennie Weinrib). At one point during each episode of the series, the group would launch into a rock or pop song, popping the sides of the medicine case open and using it like a stage with Doctor Dolittle's bottles of pills and medicines glowing and flashing into different psychedelic colors behind the group as they sang. The singing voices of the Grasshoppers are provided by Robbie Faldoon, Annadell, Colin Johnson, Mike Sherwood, and Glyn Nelson.
 Sam Scurvy (voiced by Lennie Weinrib in a Brooklyn accent) - the leader of a faction of pirates of the organization D.O.P.I. who plans to learn how to talk to animals so that he can take over the world. Sam Scurvy wears a fedora and a business suit.
 Cyclops - a hulking dimwit pirate with an eyepatch over his good eye.
 Zig-Zag (voiced by Lennie Weinrib) - an uptight French pirate.
 Nico (voiced by Don Messick) - an Italian pirate.
 Miko - a Chinese pirate.

Episodes

Cast
 Bob Holt – Dr. John Dolittle, additional voices
 Hal Smith – Tommy Stubbins
 Lennie Weinrib – Sam Scurvy, Zig-Zag, George Grasshopper
 Don Messick – Jip the Dog, Pushmi-Pullyu, Chee-Chee, Nico
 Robert Towers – additional voices

Syndication problems
Aside from a brief period in the early 1980s as part of The Krofft Supershow, the series has never been shown in syndication, possibly due to the politically incorrect stereotypes of the pirate crew, as well as the strong drug implications present during George and the Grasshoppers' rock and pop numbers.

It first appeared on British TV on BBC1 on Thursday, 25 November 1971. It was dubbed in Sinhala in Sri Lanka as "Dosthara Hoda hitha".

References

External links
 Doctor Dolittle at Internet Movie Database
 

NBC original programming
1970s American animated television series
1970 American television series debuts
1971 American television series endings
American children's animated fantasy television series
Television series by DePatie–Freleng Enterprises
Television series by 20th Century Fox Television
Animated television shows based on films
Animated musical groups
Television shows based on British novels
Doctor Dolittle